The 1998 season was the seventh full year of competitive football in the Baltic country as an independent nation. The Estonia national football team failed to qualify for the 1998 FIFA World Cup in France. The team ended up in fifth place in the final ranking of group 4, with one win, one draw and eight losses.

Mexico vs Estonia

Estonia vs Azerbaijan

Estonia vs Faroe Islands

Estonia vs Andorra

Estonia vs Latvia

Estonia vs Lithuania

Estonia vs Moldova

Bosnia-Herzegovina vs Estonia

Estonia vs Egypt

Scotland vs Estonia

Czech Republic vs Estonia

Georgia vs Estonia

Armenia vs Estonia

Azerbaijan vs Estonia

Notes

References
 RSSSF detailed results
 RSSSF detailed results

1998
National football team results
National